Yayijilu (also Romanized as Yāyjīlū; also known as Yadzhili, Yājelī, Yājelū, Yajili, Yājlū, and Yāychelī) is a village in Goyjah Bel Rural District, in the Central District of Ahar County, East Azerbaijan Province, Iran. At the 2006 census, its population was 151, in 26 families.

References 

Populated places in Ahar County